Cılbayır is a village in Silifke district of Mersin Province, Turkey. It is situated in Taurus Mountains to the west of  Göksu River valley. The population of  Cılbayır is 114 as of 2011.

References

Villages in Silifke District